For the river which is a tributary of the River Towy see River Gwili

The Afon Gwili is a right-bank tributary of the River Loughor in the east of Carmarthenshire, South Wales. It rises near Cross Hands before flowing in a generally southerly direction past the small village of Cwmgwili to join with the Loughor beyond Hendy near Pontarddulais.

References 

Rivers of Carmarthenshire